Pandemis metallochroma is a species of moth of the  family Tortricidae. It is found in Madagascar.

References

	

Moths described in 1948
Pandemis